Neil Robert Edwards (born 2 July 1967) is an English former professional association footballer who played as a striker. He played one match in the Football League for Burnley.

References

English footballers
Association football forwards
Liverpool F.C. players
Burnley F.C. players
English Football League players
Footballers from Liverpool
1967 births
Living people